HMS Asp was an Acute-class gunbrig (ex-GB No.5), of the British Royal Navy. The Navy disposed of her in 1803.

Career
Lieutenant Joseph Edmonds commissioned Asp in April 1797, for the Channel.

In 1798 she participated in Sir Home Popham's failed attack on Ostend. While she engaged shore batteries four hours in support of a landing by troops she had one seaman killed, and Lieutenant Edmonds was wounded.

Between 1798 and 1803 she was under the command of Lieutenant Isaac Ferriers. Asp and  shared in the proceeds of the capture on 18 June 1799 of the galliot Jane.

In July 1800 Asp escorted a convoy to the West Indies.

Because Asp served in the navy's Egyptian campaign between 8 March 1801 and 2 September, her officers and crew qualified for the clasp "Egypt" to the Naval General Service Medal that the Admiralty issued in 1847 to all surviving claimants.

Fate
Asp was paid-off on 15 February 1803. She was sold circa July 1803.

Citations and references
Citations

References
 

1797 ships
Ships built in Rotherhithe
Brigs of the Royal Navy